Samuel Browne (born 3 August 1844, date of death unknown) was a Barbadian cricketer. He played in three first-class matches for the Barbados cricket team from 1864 to 1872.

See also
 List of Barbadian representative cricketers

References

External links
 

1844 births
Year of death missing
Barbadian cricketers
Barbados cricketers
People from Saint Philip, Barbados